The Canton Terriers was the name of a minor league baseball team from Canton, Ohio that played between 1928 and 1942. The team was formed in 1928 as a member of the Central League and played there until 1932. In 1936 a new Terriers team was formed and began play in the Middle Atlantic League, as an affiliate of the Boston Red Sox, until 1942.

The team folded in 1942, when the rest of the Middle Atlantic League suspended operations due to the strains of World War II. The Terriers were not re-established when the league resumed operations after the war.

During their brief history, the team won one title in the Central League and two titles in the Middle Atlantic League.

Notable players
Mose Solomon, the "Rabbi of Swat," Major League Baseball player

Year-by-year record

Baseball teams established in 1928
Baseball teams disestablished in 1942
Boston Red Sox minor league affiliates
Defunct minor league baseball teams
Sports in Canton, Ohio
1928 establishments in Ohio
1942 disestablishments in Ohio
Professional baseball teams in Ohio
Defunct baseball teams in Ohio
Central League teams
Middle Atlantic League teams